Christmas in Vienna is a 1997 Croatian film written and directed by Branko Schmidt, starring Filip Šovagović and Bojana Gregorić.

See also
 List of Christmas films

References

External links
 

1997 films
1990s Croatian-language films
Films directed by Branko Schmidt
1990s Christmas drama films
Films set in Vienna
Croatian drama films